Built in c.1560, Grimshaw Hall is a half-timbered Tudor manor house located in the village of Knowle, approximately 15 miles from the city of Birmingham, England. The Hall takes its name from the Grimshaw family who occupied it from 1620 to around 1765.

Grimshaw Hall is Grade I listed and is considered to be a fine example of Elizabethan domestic architecture. It has a main hall block between two cross-wings which project forwards about six feet; in the centre is a fine two-storeyed porch, which completes the E plan often favoured at that time.

The hall is visible during winter months through the bare hedgerows of Hampton Road running between Knowle and Hampton-in-Arden. At most other times of the year the hall retains its seclusion.

Trivia
Queen Mary visited Grimshaw Hall in 1927.

References
 In depth study of the Grimshaw family and the Hall

External links

Country houses in the West Midlands (county)
Grade I listed houses
Grade I listed buildings in the West Midlands (county)